Ashok Bhushan (born 5 July 1956) is a former Judge of Supreme Court of India and the current Chairperson of National Company Law Appellate Tribunal. He was the 31st Chief Justice of Kerala High Court. He is former Judge of Kerala High Court and Allahabad High Court.

Early life
Ashok Bhushan was born in Jaunpur district, Uttar Pradesh on 5 July 1956 to late Shri Chandrama Prasad Srivastava and his wife Smt. Kalavathi Srivasthava. After completion of graduation as  Bachelor of Arts in the year 1975 he studied Law in Allahabad University and completed the same in the year 1979.

Career
Asok Bhushan started his career in advocacy by enrolling with Bar Council of Uttar Pradesh on 6 April 1979 and started practising in Civil and Original side at Allahabad High Court till the elevation to the Bench.  While practising as an advocate in Allahabad High Court, he served as the standing counsel for various institutions such as Allahabad University, State Mineral Development Corporation Limited and several Municipal Boards, Banks & Education Institutions and also as the Senior Vice – President of the Allahabad High court Bar Association. 
Elevated as permanent Judge of the Allahabad High Court on 24 April 2001 he served as Chairman of Higher Judicial Service Committee and headed several other committees.

He was appointed Judge of the High Court of Kerala on 10 July 2014, has taken charge as Acting  Chief Justice  on 1 August 2014 and as Chief Justice on 26 March 2015.

He was appointed Judge of the Supreme Court of India on 13 May 2016.

On the farewell speech organised by the Supreme Court Bar Association, Ashok said “Grant of appropriate remedy is not the discretion of the judge but his obligation. Justice must be tempered with mercy but justice cannot be substituted for mercy.” He retired on 4 July 2021.

On 8 November 2021, he took oath as the Chairperson of National Company Law Appellate Tribunal.

References

External links
 High Court of Kerala

Living people
1956 births
Judges of the Kerala High Court
Judges of the Allahabad High Court
Chief Justices of the Kerala High Court
20th-century Indian judges
People from Jaunpur, Uttar Pradesh
Justices of the Supreme Court of India
21st-century Indian judges
University of Allahabad alumni